Halle Cioffi (born 5 August 1969 ) is  a retired professional tennis player from the United States. She is also known as Halle Carroll.  She has two kids named Christopher and Ellie Rae.

Tennis

Singles
Halle Cioffi won her only WTA singles title in 1987 at Virginia Slims of Indianapolis after defeating Anne Smith in the final match	4–6, 6–4, 7–6.

Doubles
Halle Cioffi's only WTA doubles title was in 1992 with Argentinian  María José Gaidano winning Internazionali Femminili di Palermo after beating Petra Langrová and Ana Segura in the final 6–3, 4–6, 6–3.

References

External links
 
 

1969 births
Living people
American female tennis players
21st-century American women